Dancin': It's On! is a 2015 American musical romantic comedy film directed and co-written by David Winters in his final film prior to his death in 2019. The cast consists of numerous winners and runner-ups from the dance competition TV show So You Think You Can Dance, led by Witney Carson and Chehon Wespi-Tschopp, with Gary Daniels and Winters.

The film was released on October 30, 2015 by Medallion Releasing, to largely negative reviews from critics and audiences.

Plot
The movie is about Jennifer (Carson), a girl from Beverly Hills, California, who is sent on a summer holiday in to meet her estranged father Jerry (Daniels) who owns a famous hotel in Panama City, Florida. While there she falls in love with Ken (Wespi-Tschopp), a boy who works there. The two compete in a dancing competition after becoming romantically involved even with disapproval from her father.

Cast
 Witney Carson as Jennifer Gabriella August
 Chehon Wespi-Tschopp as Ken
 David Winters as Hal Sanders
 Jordan Clark as Shotsy
 Gary Daniels as Jerry August
 Matt Marr as Danny
 Russell Ferguson as the Captain
 Pauline Mata as Pauline
 Ava Fabian as Jennifer's mother
 Brandon Bryant as Brandon
 Tadd Gadduang as Tadd
 Comfort Fedoke as Comfort

Critical reception
Los Angeles Times reviewer Michael Rechtshaffen, gave the film a largely negative review which concluded, "the low-budget production, with its soapy dialogue and cheesy video effects, should have splurged for someone to help choreograph the leads' stiffly executed dramatic exchanges." The Seattle Times reviewer Soren Andersen rated the film one star out of four, criticizing the "simplistic" plot and stiff acting of the lead characters.

References

External links
 
 
 

2015 films
2015 romantic drama films
2010s romantic musical films
American coming-of-age films
American dance films
American musical drama films
American romantic drama films
American romantic musical films
American teen romance films
American independent films
2010s English-language films
Films directed by David Winters
2010s American films
2015 independent films